Helga Gitmark (30 September 1929 – 2 August 2008) was a Norwegian politician for the Centre Party.

Biography 
She was the Minister of the Environment from March to October 1973 during the cabinet Korvald, replacing Trygve Haugeland. She was also the world's first female environment minister. She lost this job when the cabinet Korvald fell.

She served in the position of deputy representative to the Norwegian Parliament from Aust-Agder during the term 1977–1981. On the local level she was member of Lillesand municipal council during the terms 1971–1975 and 1991–1995. She was born in Holt.

She was a member of the central committee of the Centre Party from 1969 to 1979, and was deputy party leader from 1973 to 1979. 
In addition she was a member of the board in several organizations within the Church of Norway, including the Diocese Council of Agder, as well as other Christian organizations.

References

Obituary Nrk.no 

1929 births
2008 deaths
Centre Party (Norway) politicians
Ministers of Climate and the Environment of Norway
Deputy members of the Storting
Aust-Agder politicians
Women government ministers of Norway
20th-century Norwegian women politicians
20th-century Norwegian politicians
Women members of the Storting